Lieutenant-Colonel Latham Valentine Stewart Blacker OBE (1 October 1887 – 19 April 1964) was a British Army officer and inventor of weapons; he invented the Blacker Bombard, from which was developed the Hedgehog anti-submarine spigot-mortar – and laid the basis of the PIAT anti-tank weapon.

A descendant of Valentine Blacker (1778–1823), he was born in Cheshire to Major Latham Blacker of the Indian Army. He was educated at Cheltenham College and Bedford School, before going to the Royal Military College, Sandhurst. After passing out from the college in 1907, he was commissioned into the Indian Army himself.

He served in Afghanistan, Turkestan, and Russia, earning several mentions in dispatches. He served with the 69th Punjabis, Queen's Own Corps of Guides, and 57th Wilde's Rifles.

He had learned to fly in 1911, receiving Certificate No. 121 from the Royal Aero Club, and at the start of the First World War he was attached to the Royal Flying Corps. He was shot down and wounded in 1915, 1916 and 1917. He was appointed Officer of the Order of the British Empire in 1921 for his service in Persia.

After the war he set himself up as a private developer of weapons funding his own research. He served on the Imperial General Staff between 1924 and 1928. He married Lady Doris Peel, the daughter of William Peel, 1st Earl Peel the former Secretary of State for India

After retiring from the Indian Army as a major in 1932, he was commissioned into the 58th (Home Counties) Field Brigade, Royal Artillery (Territorial Army).

In 1933, he was with the Lady Houston-funded expedition to fly over Mount Everest. He organized the event with Colonel Percy T. Etherton and was the chief observer, writing a book First over Everest.

At the start of the Second World War he was a lieutenant colonel. He took his weapons to his contacts at the War Office and was introduced to Major Millis Jefferis who engaged him and sent him to Coates Castle at Coates, West Sussex, from where his Blacker Bombard, a spigot mortar was developed. It was adopted briefly by the British Army before it was redeployed for use with the Home Guard.

Later one of his experimental guns based on the same principle was developed further by Jefferis and entered service as the PIAT. For his contributions to the Bombard, PIAT, the Hedgehog anti-submarine mortar and Petard demolition mortar he received £25,000 interim payment and a further £7,000 by the Royal Commission on Awards to Inventors (the body which determined the recompense to inventors whose ideas were used by the government during the war).

Blacker retired from the Territorial Army in October 1942.

Published works
 On Secret Patrol in High Asia. London: John Murray, 1922.
 First over Everest: The Houston – Mount Everest Expedition 1933, Cherry Tree (Withy Grove Press), GB (1938), Fellowes, P. F. M. with L. V. Stewart Blacker and P. T. Etherton and the Marquess of Douglas and Clydesdale.

Notes

References

 
 Blacker, Barnaby The Adventures and Inventions of Stewart Blacker  Pen and Sword.

External links
 Obituary in Flight magazine

1887 births
1964 deaths
Military personnel from Cheshire
British Army personnel of World War I
British Army personnel of World War II
British Indian Army officers
20th-century British inventors
Corps of Guides (India) officers
Officers of the Order of the British Empire
People educated at Bedford School
People educated at Cheltenham College
Royal Artillery officers
Royal Flying Corps officers
Weapon designers
Graduates of the Royal Military College, Sandhurst
Recipients of the MacGregor Medal